The Puerto Rico State Commission on Elections—Spanish: Comisión Estatal de Elecciones de Puerto Rico (CEEPR or CEE-PUR)—is the government agency of the executive branch of the government of Puerto Rico that oversees and manages elections in Puerto Rico as well as guaranteeing the right to vote to its citizens. The agency was created on December 20, 1977 by Act No. 4 of 1997.

References

External links
 CEEPUR Official Site 

Puerto Rico
Elections in Puerto Rico
1997 establishments in Puerto Rico